The 1899 Missouri Tigers football team was an American football team that represented the University of Missouri as an independent during the 1899 college football season. The team compiled a 9–2 record and outscored its opponents by a combined total of 242 to 56. Dave Fultz was the head coach for the second of two seasons. The team played its home games at Rollins Field in Columbia, Missouri.

Schedule

References

Missouri
Missouri Tigers football seasons
Missouri Tigers football